This is a list of highest points in the U.S. state of Nevada, in alphabetical order by county.

All elevations use the North American Vertical Datum of 1988 (NAVD88), the currently accepted vertical control datum for United States, Canada and Mexico. Elevations are from the National Geodetic Survey when available. Others are from the United States Geological Survey topographic maps when available. Elevations followed by a plus sign (+) were interpolated using topographic map contour lines. The true elevation is between that shown and the elevation plus forty feet since the relevant topographic maps all use 40-foot contours.

Boundary Peak is the highest peak in terms of elevation, however, it has only 253 feet of clean prominence and so is usually considered a subsidiary peak of Montgomery Peak in California. Wheeler Peak, the next highest, has a clean prominence of 7,563 feet.

References 
 

Highest points by county
Geography of Nevada
Highpointing
Nevada